The Lola T616 is a sports prototype built by Lola Cars to the Group C2 and IMSA GTP regulations. It was built with the intention to compete in the IMSA GT Championship and the World Sportscar Championship, and became the second Mazda-powered prototype to score a class win at the 24 Hours of Le Mans after the 717C triumphed in the same C2 class at the 1983 24 Hours of Le Mans.

Background
The T616's predecessor, the Lola T600, was the first sports prototype to utilise ground effect, a feature that was also included on the T616. The T600 won IMSA titles in 1981 and 1982, but later on the T600's lack of competitiveness and the introduction of the Group C2 regulations spurred Lola to build derivatives of the T600, the T610 and the T616. The T616 was designed with the intent of fitting smaller engines as stipulated by the Group C2 regulations, with Jim Busby replacing the T600's  Chevrolet V8 with a twin-rotor  rotary, the 13B. The T600's carbon-fibre reinforced aluminium honeycomb structure monocoque was retained in the T616, and the engine acted as a semi-stressed member along with two tubular frames mounted across the cockpit.

Specifications

Lubrication was provided by a dry sump system, and the engine was cooled by a vane pump fed with water. The car's ride height was controlled by outboard A-arms at the front, and outboard control arms at the rear. The suspension was constructed in such a way that the springs and Bilstein gas dampers were situated on top the crossbeam, meaning that the flow of the air through the underbody Venturi tunnels was largely undisturbed. Pete Halsmer remarked that the car was a "handful to drive", with poor handling, and the "weight distribution left something to be desired."

Of the four T616 chassis built by Lola, three were fitted with Mazda's 13B rotary, and one was fitted with a plastic engine, Matty Holtzberg's Polimotor. The Polimotor incorporated large amounts of a thermoplastic called Torlon, manufactured by Amoco, who was also the title sponsor of Holtzberg's T616. The initial prototype, built in 1979, was based on Ford's LL23 inline-four, and much of the timing structure along with the connecting rods were injection moulded from Torlon. The crankshaft and camshaft, among other components, remained as original Ford parts.

Holtzberg campaigned his Polimotor-powered T616 in the 1984 and 1985 seasons of the IMSA GT Championship, with his sole engine-related retirement coming as a result of a metal connecting rod failure. Holtzberg's campaign did not continue due to the lack of funding to help further develop his engine.

Racing history
Jim Busby chose not to run a full season in the 1984 IMSA GT Championship, opting to only compete at the bigger races, the 24 Hours of Daytona, the Grand Prix of Miami, the 6 Hours of Riverside, the Mid-Ohio 500, and the 6 Hours of Watkins Glen. The T616 made its racing debut at the opening round of the 1984 IMSA GT Championship at Daytona under the BFGoodrich Racing banner, where the No. 68 driven by Pete Halsmer, Dieter Quester, Ron Grable and Rick Knoop placed 11th in the GTP class (17th overall), and the sister No. 67 of Jim Busby, Rick Knoop and Boy Hayje didn't make it to the flag, having stopped on lap 391 with a blown engine, and was classified 31st overall. A double points finish was the team's result at the 1984 3 Hours of Miami, with the No. 67 and No.68 finishing sixth and fifth, respectively. The two cars were then flown over to Europe to compete in the season-opener of the 1984 World Sportscar Championship, the 1984 1000 km of Monza, where they posted their best finish of the season with the No. 67 and No. 68 taking first and fifth in the C2 class, respectively. Car No. 67 returned to the United States briefly for the 1984 6 Hours of Riverside, where it placed 39th.

It reunited with its sister car for the 1984 24 Hours of Le Mans, where Mazda's factory racing division, Mazdaspeed, had also entered a pair of Mazda 727Cs. The factory 727Cs were significantly faster than Busby's T616s, posting lap times almost ten seconds quicker in practice. The T616 made up for their lack of pace with reliability; the factory 727Cs were overcome with gearbox troubles that cost them significant amounts of time. All four cars finished, with Busby's No. 68 car driven by John Morton, John O'Steen and Yoshimi Katayama in first position in the C2 class, and himself in third in class alongside co-drivers Rick Knoop and Boy Hayje in the No. 67. The factory 727Cs, despite their pace, finished fourth and sixth in class.

By the end of 1984, Lola withdrew factory support for all T600 variants, including the T616, due to their lack of competitiveness with the quickly changing GTP class in IMSA, and instead focus their efforts on the Chevrolet Corvette GTP. Holtzberg moved to the inaugural GTP Lights class for 1985, posting several points-scoring class finishes, including a third place at the 1985 2 Hours of Lime Rock.

Racing record

Complete IMSA GT Championship results
(key) Races in bold indicates pole position. Races in italics indicates fastest lap.

Complete World Sportscar Championship results
(key) Races in bold indicates pole position. Races in italics indicates fastest lap.

References

Bibliography
 

Cars introduced in 1983
Lola racing cars
Group C cars
IMSA GTP cars